The prepatellar bursa is a frontal bursa of the knee joint. It is a superficial bursa with a thin synovial lining located between the skin and the patella.

Pathology
Prepatellar bursitis, also known as housemaid's knee, is a common cause of swelling and pain above the patella (kneecap), and is due to inflammation of the prepatellar bursa.  It is common in people who frequently kneel, such as roofers, plumbers, carpet layers, and gardeners. It is also common in wrestlers due to the repeated impact on the knee when shooting.

Symptoms 
Symptoms include knee pain, swelling, redness and inability to flex the knee on the affected side.  Rest usually relieves symptoms. Physical exam reveals erythema, tenderness to touch, fluctuant edema over the lower pole of the patella and crepitus.

Treatment 
General treatments consist of bursal aspiration, NSAIDs. For patients with high athletic or occupational demands, intrabursal steroid injection may be performed. Surgical treatment is restricted to severe cases.

References

Synovial bursae
Lower limb anatomy
Knee